The 1997–98 CERH European League was the 34th edition of the CERH European League organized by CERH. Its Final Four was held in Vercelli, Italy.

Preliminary round

|}

First round

|}

Group stage
In each group, teams played against each other home-and-away in a home-and-away round-robin format.

The two first qualified teams advanced to the Final Four.

Group A

Group B

Final four
The Final Four was played in Vercelli, Italy.

Igualada achieved their fifth title.

Bracket

References

External links
 CERH website

1997 in roller hockey
1998 in roller hockey
Rink Hockey Euroleague